The Medaille Trust is a UK-based charity founded by several Catholic Congregations. Its main aim is to bring restoration and freedom to victims of human trafficking. The charity was established in 2006 and has since grown into a national network supporting all people trapped in modern slavery – women, men and families.

Medaille Trust is currently the largest provider of supported safe house beds for victims of modern slavery in the UK. They combat human trafficking and modern slavery by:

- offering safe housing

- providing support for victims

- raising awareness in communities, and

- partnering with law enforcement authorities.

Visit their website:https://www.medaille-trust.org.uk

References
Guardian Unlimited: Raped, beaten and helpless: UK's sex slaves
Catholic Bishops Urge Government to Sign Up to European Convention on Human Trafficking
www.medaille-trust.org.uk

Religious charities based in the United Kingdom
Human trafficking in the United Kingdom
Contemporary slavery